The 1963–64 Midland Football League season was the 64th in the history of the Midland Football League, a football competition in England.

Clubs
The league featured 19 clubs which competed in the previous season, along with three new clubs:
Arnold St. Mary's, joined from the Central Alliance, who also changed name to Arnold
Lockheed Leamington, transferred from the West Midlands (Regional) League
Scarborough, joined from the North Eastern League

League table

References

External links

M
Midland Football League (1889)